Kilometers and Kilometers is an Indian Malayalam-language comedy-drama road movie directed by Jeo Baby. The film is jointly produced by Tovino Thomas, Ramshi Ahamed, Anto Joseph and Sinu Sidharth, under the banner of Anto Joseph Film Company and Ramshi Ahamed Productions. The film starring Tovino Thomas, Joju George, India Jarvis, Sidhartha Siva and Basil Joseph, is a road film that follows the story of an American lady (played by Jarvis) who sets out on a journey with a man from Kottayam (played by Thomas). The title of the film refers to a popular dialogue from the 1986 film Mazha Peyyunnu Maddalam Kottunnu starring Mohanlal and directed by Priyadarshan.

Initially scheduled to be released on 12 March 2020, the film was indefinitely postponed due to the COVID-19 pandemic. The movie was finally released worldwide on 31 August 2020 (during Thiruvonam) through the general entertainment channel, Asianet.

Plot
Josemon is a local handyman in his village. He does everything to make his ends meet but he is not able to earn enough to support his family and his sister's education. Finally, without options, he decides to sell his Bullet (Royal Enfield Bullet) motorbike which he had kept as a memory of his father. But the same day Cathy comes into his life.

Cathy is an American who came to visit India and is looking for a local guide who can take her everywhere in India. Appachan asks Josemon to do the job. Josemon is supposed to take her to Jaipur on road from where she will fly back to the US. Josemon takes her on a journey through Tamil Nadu, Karnataka, Gujarat and while on the way to Jaipur their belongings get stolen from the bike.

Everything including their money, passports, dresses were stolen and both of them go to the police station to complain. On their way, they meet Sunny and become friends. Sunny invites them to stay with him till Cathy can arrange some money for visiting the American consulate and reapply for a passport. But during their stay with Sunny, Cathy meets with an accident and breaks her arm. Josemon takes her to a hospital. But during the few days at the hospital, Josemon had to sell-off his bike to meet the hospital expenses and Cathy's interview.

Cathy becomes upset that Josemon sold his bike for her. Cathy confesses that she was just lying that she does not have the money yet because she was enjoying her stay with Josemon. Cathy and Sunny search for the bike they could not find it.

Cathy and Josemon get her passport and they both go to Mumbai. Her mother gets her flight tickets to the US. Before leaving Josemon gives her a letter saying that he is in love with her. Josemon returns to Kerala.

Three months later, we see Josemon working in a workshop in his village as a bullet expert. He gets a letter from the Police station in Jaipur that they have recovered his driver's license and other belongings and asks him to come and collect it. He gets a phone call from Sunny the same day saying that he is now the father of a baby now and he wants Josemon to come and see the baby. When Josemon reaches Jaipur he sees his old bullet motorcycle with Cathy. Sunny and Cathy worked hard and was able to get Josemon's bullet motorcycle back, which makes Josemon happy.
 
Later, we see that Josemon and Cathy continuing their journey in Josemon's Bullet across India.

Cast
 Tovino Thomas as Josemon
 India Jarvis as Cathy
 Joju George as Appachan
 Sidhartha Siva as Sunny / Veerbhai
 Basil Joseph as Kuttan
 Mamitha Baiju as Josemon's Sister
 Parvathi T as Josemon's Mother 
 Pauly Valsan as Kuttan's mother
 Jeo Baby as Villager
 Sinu Sidharth as Bike Rider

Production

Development 
In October 2018, Tovino Thomas was announced to star in Jeo Baby's third directorial film, with whom Thomas earlier collaborated in the 2016 film 2 Penkuttikal. The film was also titled as Kilometers and Kilometers, which is a famous dialogue from the Mohanlal-starrer Mazha Peyunnu Maddalam Kottunnu (1986). Thomas was reported to play a youth from a rural area and it is touted to be a road-drama film. The first look was launched in February 2019 by actor Mohanlal, which also named him as the film producer. The film marked Tovino's first film as a producer and sharing about the script, he stated that "The script of this film is one of the best I have come across so far and I should say that its shoot was something I really enjoyed being involved in throughout."

Casting 
Jeo Baby, approached American actress India Jarvis to play the role of Catherine, after he tried to cast a foreign actress for the role since 2017. Jeo explained that the process was tough since many foreigners were not ready to come to India because of safety concerns and the difficult work schedules. He added "After our search through casting calls and agencies proved futile, we tried through our individual connections and that’s how we finally found India through Mathews [Pullickan], who was the composer of my film Kunju Daivam. We watched certain short films she was part of and zeroed in on her for the role." About her role Catherine, India stated that she had to learn Malayalam for few scenes in the film, which was her "biggest challenge" and stated that Tovino guided her to learn Malayalam for the film. Joju George who was a part of Baby's previous film Kunju Deivam was assigned to play Appachan in the film.

Filming 
Shooting of the film commenced in February 2019, with Tovino sharing few pictures from Ladakh as a part of the shoot. In March 2019, the team moved to  Kozhikode where the second schedule of filming progressed. The team travelled across the country for 36 days, covering Tamil Nadu, Karnataka, Maharashtra, Goa, Gujarat and Rajasthan, where many important parts of it were shot. The climax portion was shot in the Himalayas.

Soundtrack 

Initially Gopi Sunder was reported to score music for the film and was also credited in the film's poster, but due to schedule conflicts he opted out of the project and subsequently Sooraj S. Kurup replaced him. The background music was scored by Sushin Shyam. On 6 March 2020, the team released the first video song "Paarake" on YouTube, followed by the film's audio launch which held before the release on 11 March 2020. However, the album was out on major music streaming platforms on 12 August 2020.

Release
Kilometers and Kilometers initially received a U certificate from the Censor Board and was scheduled for a release on 12 March 2020. However, two days before the scheduled release, the government had ordered to shut theatres across Kerala in the wake of COVID-19 pandemic, and the team had to postpone the release. In April 2020, the film was subjected to internet piracy after few of the scenes were leaked online, causing the producer Anto Joseph to approach the Film Exhibitors Union of Kerala (FEUOK) seeking permission to release it on over-the-top media service. The union immediately approved for OTT release as in consideration with the huge losses, the producer had to suffer because of piracy.

Initially the film was set to release on Disney+ Hotstar, but the team planned to go for a direct television premiere on Asianet during the occasion of Onam (31 August 2020). On 28 January 2021, the film was aired digitally through Netflix.

References

External links
 

2020 films
2020s Malayalam-language films
Indian road comedy-drama films
Films shot in Daman and Diu
Films shot in Kozhikode
Films shot in Tamil Nadu
Films shot in Karnataka
Films shot in Maharashtra
Films shot in Goa
Films shot in Gujarat
Films shot in Rajasthan
Indian television films
2020 television films
Films scored by Sooraj S. Kurup
Films directed by Jeo Baby
2020s road comedy-drama films